was a Japanese voice actor from Iwate, most known for his role as Nanbutsu Isasaka in Sazae-san.

Death
Yasuo Iwata died from lung cancer on October 24, 2009, aged 67.

Voice roles
Cosmic Baton Girl Comet-san (King, Mago-Consigliere)
Heat Guy J (Old Man (ep.5))
Last Exile (Marius)
Lupin III: the Columbus Files (special) (The President)
Sazae-san (Nanbutsu Isasaka)
Shadow Star (Shiina's grandfather (ep.1))
The Vision of Escaflowne (Asona)
Tokyo Mew Mew (Mr. Ijuuin (ep.29))
Zenki (Kukai (ep.19-21))

Dubbing
Charlotte's Web, Dr. Dorian (Beau Bridges)
Kindergarten Cop (1995 TV Asahi edition), Captain Salazar (Richard Portnow)
The Majestic, Doc Stanton (David Ogden Stiers)
Ocean's Twelve (2007 NTV edition), Bank Officer
Screamers, Secretary Green (Bruce Boa)

References

External links

1942 births
2009 deaths
Deaths from lung cancer in Japan
Japanese male voice actors
Male voice actors from Iwate Prefecture